Ann Bartholomew may refer to:

Ann Mounsey Bartholomew (1811–1891), British pianist, organist and composer
Ann Charlotte Bartholomew (1800–1862), English painter and author

See also
Anne of St. Bartholomew (1550–1626), Spanish Roman Catholic professed religious